United Nations Security Council resolution 539, adopted on 28 October 1983, after hearing a report from the Secretary-General and reaffirming resolutions 301 (1971), 385 (1976), 431 (1978), 432 (1978), 435 (1978), 439 (1978) and 532 (1983), the council condemned South Africa's continued occupation of Namibia, then known as South West Africa, and the tension and instability prevailing in southern Africa as a result.

The resolution also condemned South Africa for its obstruction of the implementation of previous resolutions on Namibia, and rejected its attempts to link irrelevant issues to the declination of independence of Namibia. The council reaffirmed the only basis for a peaceful settlement of the issue is to allow Namibian independence.

Finally, the council urged South Africa to cooperate with the Secretary-General on plans for implementing the United Nations provisions outlined in Resolution 435, requesting him to report back to the council by 31 December 1983.

Resolution 539 was adopted with 14 votes to none, while the United States abstained from voting.

See also
 List of United Nations Security Council Resolutions 501 to 600 (1982–1987)
 Namibian War of Independence
 South African Border Wars
 South Africa under apartheid

References
Text of the Resolution at undocs.org

External links
 

 0539
20th century in South Africa
1983 in Africa
 0539
 0539
October 1983 events